Carlos Vinicius Neves da Silva (born 10 August 1982 in Rio de Janeiro), better known as just Vinicius or Vini,  is a Brazilian footballer, who plays for Artsul.

Career
In August 2003, he was signed by Dijon FCO in Championnat National. 

In August 2006, he joined F.C. Penafiel in Liga de Honra  and in summer leave Penafiel and joined in January 2008 to Mesquita Futebol Clube.

In July 2008, he left on loan to Angra dos Reis Esporte Clube

External links
 2007–08 Profile at Portuguese Liga
 
Player Profile

Brazilian footballers
Brazilian expatriate footballers
Bangu Atlético Clube players
Dijon FCO players
F.C. Penafiel players
Villa Rio Esporte Clube players
Artsul Futebol Clube players
Association football defenders
Footballers from Rio de Janeiro (city)
1982 births
Living people